Loverval is a village of Wallonia and a district of the municipality of Gerpinnes, located in the province of Hainaut, Belgium.

Former municipalities of Hainaut (province)